EIB may refer to:

Science and technology 
 Earth's energy imbalance, a condition of unequal inflow of energy to, and outflow of energy from, Earth's climate system
 Element Interconnect Bus, on a cell microprocessor
 European Installation Bus, a communications protocol
 Exbibyte, a unit of digital information

Other uses 
 EIB Network, the syndication network for The Rush Limbaugh Show
 European Investment Bank, the European Union's financing institution
 Even in Blackouts, an American band
 Exercise-induced bronchoconstriction
 Expert Infantryman Badge, of the United States Army
 Exportbank, a Philippine commercial bank
 Extreme Ironing Bureau, the governing body of the tongue-in-cheek sport of extreme ironing